The Ambassador Extraordinary and Plenipotentiary of Ukraine to Germany is the ambassador of Ukraine to Germany. The current ambassador is Oleksiy Makeev. He assumed the position in October 2022.

The first Ukrainian ambassador to Germany assumed his post in 1992, the same year a Ukrainian embassy opened in Berlin.

List of representatives

Ukrainian People's Republic
 1918-1918 Teodor Shteingel
 1918-1920 Mykola Porsh
 1920-1923 Roman Smal-Stocki
 1923-1923 Mykola von Wassilko

Ukraine
 6 March 1992 - 07 June 1994: Ivan Piskovyi
 28 December 1994 - 2 September 1997: Yurii V. Kostenko
 2 September 1997 - 26 November 2003: Anatoly Ponomarenko
 28 November 2003 - 26 July 2005: Serhiy Farenyk
 9 December 2005 - 4 April 2008: Ihor Dolhov
 4 September 2008 - 16 December 2011: Natalia Zarudna
 22 June 2012 - 19 June 2014: Pavlo Klimkin
 20 December 2014 - 14 October 2022: Andriy Melnyk
 24 October 2022 -  Incumbent: Oleksiy Makeev

See also 
 Ukrainian Embassy, Berlin
 Embassy of Germany, Kyiv

References

External links 
  Embassy of Ukraine to Germany: Previous Ambassadors

Ambassadors of Ukraine to Germany
Germany
Ukraine